The men's 4 × 200 metre freestyle relay event at the 2016 Summer Olympics took place on 9 August at the Olympic Aquatics Stadium.

Summary
After winning the 200 m butterfly title less than an hour earlier, the double gold rush continued for U.S. swimming icon Michael Phelps, as he helped his teammates Conor Dwyer, youngster Townley Haas, and eleven-time medalist Ryan Lochte solidify their historic seventeenth Olympic title in this event. The American foursome of Dwyer (1:45.23), Haas (1:44.14), Lochte (1:46.03), and Phelps (1:45.26) dominated the race from the start to put together a first-place finish in 7:00.26. As the Americans defended their Olympic title, Phelps also earned a twenty-first gold to raise his overall medal tally to twenty-five.

Great Britain's Stephen Milne (1:46.97), Duncan Scott (1:45.05), and Daniel Wallace (1:46.26) struggled to chase against the rest of the teams throughout the race, until anchor James Guy launched a late attack on the home stretch with a 1:44.85 split to deliver the British quartet a historic relay silver medal in 7:03.13. Meanwhile, Japan's Kosuke Hagino (1:45.34), along with his teammates Naito Ehara (1:46.11) and Yuki Kobori (1:45.71) held the runner-up spot for three-fourths of the race, but their anchor and four-time Olympian Takeshi Matsuda (1:46.34) could not keep off Guy towards a close finish, leaving the Japanese with a bronze in a final time of 7:03.50.

Australia's Thomas Fraser-Holmes (1:45.81), David McKeon (1:45.63), Daniel Smith (1:47.37), and Mack Horton (1:45.37) missed the podium by nearly three tenths of a second behind Japan, finishing with a fourth-place time in 7:04.18. The Russian team of Danila Izotov (1:46.72), Aleksandr Krasnykh (1:45.67), Nikita Lobintsev (1:46.31), and Mikhail Dovgalyuk (1:47.00) picked up the fifth spot in 7:05.70, with Germany (7:07.28), the Netherlands (7:09.10), and Belgium (7:11.64) following them by a couple of seconds to round out the top eight.

In the medal ceremony, the medals for the competition were presented by Karl Stoss, Austria, IOC member, and the gifts were presented by Pipat Panangvait, Thailand, Honorary Treasurer of FINA.

Records
Prior to this competition, the existing world and Olympic records were as follows.

Competition format

The competition consisted of two rounds: heats and a final. The relay teams with the best 8 times in the heats advanced to the final. Swim-offs were used as necessary to break ties for advancement to the next round.

Results

Heats
A total of sixteen countries have qualified to participate. The best eight from two heats advanced to the final.

Final

References

Men's 4 x 200 metre freestyle relay
Olympics
Men's events at the 2016 Summer Olympics